The 2020 San Diego Loyal SC season is the club's first season of existence and their first season in the USL Championship (USLC). This article covers the period from the founding of the club to the conclusion of the 2020 USLC Playoff Final, scheduled for November 12–16, 2020.

Roster

Competitions

Exhibitions

USL Championship

Match results
On January 9, 2020, the USL announced the 2020 season schedule.

Standings — Group B

Standings — Western Conference

U.S. Open Cup 

As a USL Championship club, San Diego was set to enter the competition in the Second Round, to be played April 7–9. The second round draw had the Loyal slated to play an away match versus Los Angeles Force scheduled for April 7. Before the match could occur, however, U.S. Soccer suspended the competition on March 13 due to the COVID-19 pandemic, before cancelling the competition altogether on August 17.

References

San Diego Loyal SC
San Diego Loyal SC
San Diego Loyal SC
San Diego Loyal SC